The Peters's musk shrew (Crocidura gracilipes) is a species of mammal in the family Soricidae. It is endemic to Tanzania.

Sources

Crocidura
Mammals of Tanzania
Endemic fauna of Tanzania
Mammals described in 1870
Taxa named by Wilhelm Peters
Taxonomy articles created by Polbot